Mount Boswell is a  summit located in Waterton Lakes National Park, in the Canadian Rockies of Alberta, Canada. It is situated along the east shore of Waterton Lake, one kilometre north of the Canada–United States border. Its nearest higher peak is Miche Wabun Peak,  to the southeast. 


History

Mount Boswell was named in 1917 for Dr. W.G. Boswell, the veterinarian for the International Boundary Commission.

The mountain's name was officially adopted in 1943 by the Geographical Names Board of Canada.

Geology

Like other mountains in Waterton Lakes National Park, Mount Boswell is composed of sedimentary rock laid down during the Precambrian to Jurassic periods. Formed in shallow seas, this sedimentary rock was pushed east and over the top of younger Cretaceous period rock during the Laramide orogeny.

Climate

Based on the Köppen climate classification, Mount Boswell is located in a subarctic climate with cold, snowy winters, and mild summers. Temperatures can drop below −20 C with wind chill factors below −30 C. Precipitation runoff from Mount Boswell drains into Waterton Lake,  thence Waterton River.

Gallery

References

External links
 Parks Canada web site: Waterton Lakes National Park
 Mount Boswell weather: Mountain Forecast

Two-thousanders of Alberta
Waterton Lakes National Park
Alberta's Rockies